Bang Rak Noi is one of the ten subdistricts (tambon) of Mueang Nonthaburi District, in Nonthaburi Province, Thailand. Neighbouring subdistricts are (from north clockwise) Om Kret, Tha It, Sai Ma, Bang Krang, Bang Len, Bang Rak Yai and Bang Rak Phatthana. In 2020 it had a total population of 21,366 people.

Administration

Central administration
The subdistrict is subdivided into 6 administrative villages (muban).

Local administration
The whole area of the subdistrict is covered by Bang Rak Noi Subdistrict Administrative Organization.

References

External links
Website of Bang Rak Noi Subdistrict Administrative Organization

Tambon of Nonthaburi province
Populated places in Nonthaburi province